West Virginia Route 14 is a north–south state highway in the western portion of the U.S. state of West Virginia. The southern terminus of the route is at U.S. Route 33 in Spencer, Roane County. The northern terminus is at Interstate 77 exit 185 and West Virginia Route 31 on the southern outskirts of Williamstown, Wood County.

The portion of the road from Williamstown to Mineral Wells in Wood County was part of U.S. Route 21 until US 21 was decommissioned statewide in 1974.

Major intersections

References

014
West Virginia Route 014
West Virginia Route 014
West Virginia Route 014